The Foreign Affairs Minister of the Palestinian National Authority is a government ministry in charge of Palestine's foreign relations. In June 2006, Israel attacked the ministry's office in Gaza City twice. The attacks were in response to the capturing of an Israeli soldier just weeks before.

List of ministers

See also
 International recognition of the State of Palestine

References

External links
 Ministry of Foreign Affairs and Expatriates State of Palestine

Foreign relations of the State of Palestine
Foreign affairs ministries